The Georgia, Carolina and Northern Railway was a Southeastern railroad that began after Reconstruction and operated up until the start of the 20th century.

The Georgia, Carolina and Northern Railway was founded in 1886 with the goal of building a line from Monroe, North Carolina, to Atlanta, Georgia. Construction on the line began in 1887 in North Carolina.

By 1892 the railroad had almost completed its original plan when a court injunction halted its progress into Atlanta. As a result, the GC&N developed the Seaboard Air Line Belt Railroad. In 1898 the railroad acquired the Loganville and Lawrenceville Railroad.

In 1901 the GC&N was formally merged into the Seaboard Air Line Railway.

References

Defunct Georgia (U.S. state) railroads
Defunct North Carolina railroads
Railway companies established in 1886
Railway companies disestablished in 1901
Predecessors of the Seaboard Air Line Railroad
Defunct South Carolina railroads